Carl Friedrich Irminger (8 November 1813 in Aadorf, Switzerland - 27 March 1863 in Zürich) was a Swiss draughtsman, lithographer and engraver.

Life and career 
Carl Friedrich Irminger is known for his watercolors and caricatures of Swiss military figures. In the 1850s he worked with painter and photographer Heinrich Schweikert (1830–1914) and created Irminger & Schweikert Photographic Institute in Zürich.

References

Further reading 
 Irminger, Karl Friedrich In: Hans Vollmer (Hrsg.): Allgemeines Lexikon der Bildenden Künstler von der Antike bis zur Gegenwart. Begründet von Ulrich Thieme und Felix Becker. Band 19: Ingouville–Kauffungen. E. A. Seemann, Leipzig 1926.
 Johann Nepomuk Vogl (Red.): Künstlerischer Wegweiser.. In: Oesterreichisches Morgenblatt, 7. April 1847, S. 167 (Online bei ANNO)
«(Friedr. Irminger,) ein Schweizer, durch seine schönen Porträtzeichnungen auf Pergament, so wie durch Lithographien und Radierungen in der Kunstwelt bekannt, hat so eben das Porträt des auch als Schriftsteller bekannten Kunsthändlers Mor. Biermann auf Stein vollendet.»
René Perret: Frappante Ähnlichkeit. Pioniere der Schweizer Photographie. Bilder der Anfänge. BEA-und-Poly-Verl., Brugg 1991, . Frappante Ähnlichkeit. Pioniere der Schweizer Photographie. Bilder der Anfänge.

1813 births
1863 deaths
Swiss lithographers
17th-century engravers
Swiss engravers
People from Münchwilen District
Draughtsmen